Ragged Islands (Newfoundland) was a small settlement near Placentia.

See also
List of communities in Newfoundland and Labrador

Populated coastal places in Canada
Populated places in Newfoundland and Labrador